Astyra is a genus of amphipods.

Astyra may also refer to:
Astyra (Aeolis), a town of ancient Aeolis near the Plain of Thebe
Astyra (near Pergamon), a town of ancient Aeolis near Pergamon
Astyra, alternate name of Astyria, a town of ancient Aeolis
Astyra (Troad), a town of ancient Troad